Peaceable Kingdom, produced in 2004 by Tribe of Heart, is a documentary about several farmers who refuse to kill animals and how they convert to veganism as a way of life.

A newer version of the film premiered in 2009 called Peaceable Kingdom: The Journey Home which featured different people. On the Tribe of Heart website for the 2009 film, there is no apparent mention of the 2004 movie.

The 2004 film tells the story of how the farmers create an animal sanctuary farm called "Farm Sanctuary" where they rescue injured animals, half dead, abandoned, and rejected by the farm industry for not being productive. A few examples are a cow with mastitis or newborn chicks unfit for production.

It has won awards such as the Festival Theme Award of the Ojai Film Festival in 2004, with music by Moby. Images of exploitations are shown during the film. According to the primatologist Jane Goodall, "Peaceable Kingdom is a piece of art".

The documentary's producers, James LaVeck and Jenny Stein, have created a website called HumaneMyth.org that explores whether animals can be used humanely for food, advocating that it is generally not possible to do so.

See also 
 Animal rights
 List of vegan media

References

External links 
 Farm Sanctuary
 Tribe of Heart
 

2004 films
American documentary films
Documentary films about animal rights
Documentary films about agriculture
2004 documentary films
Films directed by Jenny Stein
2000s English-language films
2000s American films

Documentary films about veganism